The Spirit of Radio: Greatest Hits 1974–1987 is a compilation album by Canadian rock band Rush, released on February 11, 2003. It includes many of the band's most popular songs from their Mercury Records era, but does not feature any material from their third album Caress of Steel. A special edition of the album included a DVD containing music videos for several songs, including "Mystic Rhythms" (which does not appear on the album itself).

Track listing

DVD titles

Personnel
Rush
 Geddy Lee – bass guitar, synthesizers, vocals
 Alex Lifeson – electric and acoustic guitars, synthesizers, vocals
 Neil Peart – drums, percussion, lyricist
* John Rutsey – drums and percussion on "Working Man"

Additional personnel
 Terry Brown – production (tracks 1–12)
Peter Collins – production (tracks 14–16)
Peter Henderson – production (track 13)
Aimee Mann – additional vocals on "Time Stand Still" and "Force Ten"

Reception
"This 16-track Best Of skips over the early years…" noted Paul Elliott in Q. "The '80s brought shorter songs, better tunes and even a Top 20 UK hit with 'The Spirit of Radio', one of the great rock singles and perhaps the only song ever to feature a Simon & Garfunkel reference, a reggae breakdown and the word 'unobtrusive'." Following Neil Peart's death in January 2020, the album re-entered the Billboard 200 at number 45.

Charts

Certifications

References

2003 greatest hits albums
2003 video albums
Music video compilation albums
Rush (band) compilation albums
Mercury Records compilation albums
Mercury Records video albums